Larry Smith (born January 18, 1958) is a former American professional basketball player. A 6'8" forward/center from Alcorn State University, Smith spent 13 seasons (1980–1993) in the National Basketball Association (NBA), playing for the Golden State Warriors, Houston Rockets, and San Antonio Spurs. Smith, nicknamed "Mr. Mean", received NBA All-Rookie Team Honors in 1981, and would become one of the best rebounders of the 1980s. He had career averages of 9.2 rebounds and 25.9 minutes per game.
Smith was affectionally nicknamed and known as "Mr. Mean" throughout his career, especially during his time with the Warriors, due to the stark contrast between him being nice and soft-spoken off the court but always with a serious demeanor and angry scowl on the court while grabbing a rebound. Smith's popularity in Golden State and Houston led to local fan clubs who would attend games wearing hard hats holding up a sign saying "Larry's Local 13". At the end of his career, Smith earned praise from the Houston Rockets coaching staff and fanbase for adequately covering for an injured Hakeem Olajuwon.

He worked as an assistant coach for Rudy Tomjanovich with the Rockets from 1993 until 2002, helping them capture their back-to-back NBA titles in 1993-94 and 1994-95. After ten years with the Rockets, Smith was hired as the assistant coach for the Atlanta Hawks in 2003. In 2004, he was hired by the Los Angeles Lakers to be the assistant coach for Tomjanovich. However, Tomjanovich resigned after 41 games into the 2004–05 season. Smith remained as an assistant coach for interim head coach Frank Hamblen until the end of the season.

After serving as an assistant coach of the Albuquerque Thunderbirds, as the head coach of the Anaheim Arsenal, and as an assistant coach for the Austin Toros in the NBA D-League, Smith was hired to be an assistant coach for the Los Angeles Sparks of the Women's National Basketball Association (WNBA) for the 2008 season.

On May 8, 2008, officials made the announcement during a news conference in Vicksburg, Mississippi that Smith has been named as the head basketball coach for Alcorn State University. In 2011, Smith was moved from this position to become director of athletic development for the school.

NBA career statistics

Regular season 

|-
| style="text-align:left;"| 
| style="text-align:left;"|Golden State
| 82 || – || 31.4 || .512 || – || .588 || 12.1 || 1.1 || 0.9 || 0.8 || 9.6
|-
| style="text-align:left;"| 
| style="text-align:left;"|Golden State
| 74 || 55 || 29.9 || .534 || .000 || .553 || 11.0 || 1.1 || 0.9 || 0.7 || 7.1
|-
| style="text-align:left;"| 
| style="text-align:left;"|Golden State
| 49 || 41 || 29.2 || .588 || – || .535 || 9.9 || 0.9 || 0.7 || 0.4 || 8.4
|-
| style="text-align:left;"| 
| style="text-align:left;"|Golden State
| 75 || 63 || 29.2 || .560 || – || .560 || 9.0 || 1.0 || 0.8 || 0.3 || 7.8
|-
| style="text-align:left;"| 
| style="text-align:left;"|Golden State
| 80 || 78 || 31.2 || .530 || – || .605 || 10.9 || 1.2 || 1.0 || 0.7 || 11.1
|-
| style="text-align:left;"| 
| style="text-align:left;"|Golden State
| 77 || 74 || 31.7 || .536 || .000 || .493 || 11.1 || 1.2 || 0.8 || 0.6 || 9.6
|-
| style="text-align:left;"| 
| style="text-align:left;"|Golden State
| 80 || 78 || 29.7 || .546 || .000 || .574 || 11.5 || 1.2 || 0.9 || 0.7 || 8.8
|-
| style="text-align:left;"| 
| style="text-align:left;"|Golden State
| 20 || 10 || 25.0 || .472 || .000 || .407 || 9.1 || 1.3 || 0.6 || 0.6 || 6.4
|-
| style="text-align:left;"| 
| style="text-align:left;"|Golden State
| 80 || 78 || 23.7 || .552 || – || .310 || 8.2 || 1.5 || 0.8 || 0.7 || 5.7
|-
| style="text-align:left;"| 
| style="text-align:left;"|Houston
| 74 || 0 || 17.6 || .474 || .000 || .364 || 6.1 || 0.9 || 0.8 || 0.4 || 3.0
|-
| style="text-align:left;"| 
| style="text-align:left;"|Houston
| 81 || 28 || 23.7 || .487 || – || .240 || 8.8 || 1.1 || 1.0 || 0.3 || 3.3
|-
| style="text-align:left;"| 
| style="text-align:left;"|Houston
| 45 || 7 || 17.8 || .543 || .000 || .364 || 5.7 || 0.7 || 0.5 || 0.2 || 2.3
|-
| style="text-align:left;"| 
| style="text-align:left;"|San Antonio
| 66 || 13 || 12.6 || .437 || – || .409 || 4.1 || 0.4 || 0.3 || 0.2 || 1.3
|- class="sortbottom"
| style="text-align:center;" colspan="2"| Career
| 883 || 525 || 25.9 || .531 || .000 || .531 || 9.2 || 1.1 || 0.8 || 0.5 || 6.7

Playoffs 

|-
|style="text-align:left;"|1987
|style="text-align:left;"|Golden State
|10||10||32.9||.531||–||.708||style="background:#cfecec;"|13.7*||1.7||1.2||0.6||10.3
|-
|style="text-align:left;"|1989
|style="text-align:left;"|Golden State
|8||8||18.5||.250||–||–||5.0||2.0||0.8||1.4||1.0
|-
|style="text-align:left;"|1990
|style="text-align:left;"|Houston
|4||0||18.3||.750||–||–||3.3||1.3||1.0||0.0||3.0
|-
|style="text-align:left;"|1991
|style="text-align:left;"|Houston
|3||0||19.0||.250||.000||.000||4.3||1.3||0.3||0.3||0.7
|-
|style="text-align:left;"|1993
|style="text-align:left;"|San Antonio
|6||0||8.3||.667||–||.750||2.7||0.2||0.7||0.3||1.2

See also
List of National Basketball Association players with most rebounds in a game
List of NCAA Division I men's basketball season rebounding leaders

References

External links
 Larry Smith Coach Profile at NBA.com
 Larry Smith NBA Statistics at Basketball-Reference.com

1958 births
Living people
African-American basketball coaches
African-American basketball players
Alcorn State Braves basketball coaches
Alcorn State Braves basketball players
American men's basketball players
Atlanta Hawks assistant coaches
Basketball coaches from Mississippi
Basketball players from Mississippi
Centers (basketball)
College men's basketball head coaches in the United States
Golden State Warriors draft picks
Golden State Warriors players
Houston Rockets assistant coaches
Houston Rockets players
Los Angeles Lakers assistant coaches
People from Rolling Fork, Mississippi
Power forwards (basketball)
San Antonio Spurs players
21st-century African-American people
20th-century African-American sportspeople